Tom Pettersen (8 May 1935 – 9 February 1994) was a Norwegian swimmer. He competed in the men's 100 metre backstroke at the 1952 Summer Olympics.

References

External links
 

1935 births
1994 deaths
Norwegian male backstroke swimmers
Olympic swimmers of Norway
Swimmers at the 1952 Summer Olympics
Sportspeople from Oslo
20th-century Norwegian people